L. compacta  may refer to:
 Leptoxis compacta, the oblong rocksnail, an extinct freshwater snail species endemic to the United States
 Liatris compacta, the Arkansas gayfeather, a herbaceous plant species native to west-central Arkansas in the United States

See also
 Compacta (disambiguation)